The 2022 Thomas & Uber Cup (officially known as the TotalEnergies BWF Thomas & Uber Cup Finals 2022 for sponsorship reasons) was the 32nd edition of the Thomas Cup and the 29th edition of the Uber Cup, the biennial international badminton championship contested by the men and women's national teams of the member associations of Badminton World Federation (BWF). The tournament was hosted at Bangkok, Thailand in the Impact Arena from 8 to 15 May 2022. This marks the third time Thailand has hosted the Thomas Cup, and second time for the Uber Cup.

Indonesia were the defending champions for the men's team, and China for the women's team.

The tournament was contested by 16 nations each in the men's and women's discipline, with a format of group stage from which top two teams qualify for the knockout stage. Denmark, India, Indonesia and Japan reached the semi-finals of the Thomas Cup while China, Japan, South Korea and Thailand were qualified to play the semi-finals of the Uber Cup.

The men's event finals was between Indonesia and India. India won 3–0 for their first title. The women's event finals was between China and South Korea in which the South Korean team won 3–2 for their second title.

Host selection
Bangkok was named as the host in November 2018 during BWF Council meeting at Kuala Lumpur, Malaysia, where the BWF also announced the host for 18 major events, including Thomas and Uber Cup, Sudirman Cup, BWF World Championships, BWF World Junior Championships, and BWF World Senior Championships from 2019 to 2025.

Qualification
Thailand qualified automatically as hosts, while Indonesia qualified as the trophy holder.

Thomas Cup

Uber Cup

 Note

Draw
The draw for the tournament was conducted on 1 April 2022, at 15:00 ICT, at Arnoma Grand Bangkok in Bangkok, Thailand. The 16 men and 16 women teams were drawn into four groups of four.

For the Thomas Cup draw, the teams were allocated to four pots based on the World Team Rankings of 22 February 2022. Pot 1 contained the top seed Indonesia (which were assigned to position A1), the second seed Japan (which were assigned to position D1) and the next two best teams, Denmark and Chinese Taipei. Pot 2 contained the next best four teams, Pot 3 contained the ninth to twelfth seeds, and Pot 4 for the thirteenth to sixteenth seeds.

A similar procedure was applied for the Uber Cup draw, where top seed Japan (were assigned to position A1), the second seed, South Korea (were assigned to position D1), China and Thailand were in Pot 1.

Thomas Cup

Uber Cup

Squads

Tiebreakers
The rankings of teams in each group were determined per BWF Statutes Section 5.1, Article 16.3:
Number of matches won;
Match result between the teams in question;
Match difference in all group matches;
Game difference in all group matches;
Point difference in all group matches.

Thomas Cup

Group stage
In the initial stage of the tournament, the teams were placed in groups of four where they contested against each other. Winning a match nets one point for the team. The top two teams from each of the four groups advanced to the knockout stage. The matches were played from 8 to 11 May 2022.

Group A

Group B

Group C

Group D

Knockout stage
The knockout stage of the tournament started from 12 May 2022 on which the quarter-finals were held. Semi-finals were held on 13 May 2022 while the finals was held on 15 May 2022. Below is the bracket for the knockout round of the tournament, teams in bold denote match winners.

Quarter-finals

Semi-finals

Finals

Final ranking

Uber Cup

Group stage

Group A

Group B

Group C

Group D

Knockout stage
The quarter and semi-finals were held between 12 and 13 May 2022 while the finals was held on 14 May 2022. Below is the bracket for the knockout round of the tournament, teams in bold denote match winners.

Quarter-finals

Semi-finals

Finals

Final ranking

References

External links
Tournament Link
Official Website – Thomas & Uber Cup

Qualification
International sports competitions hosted by Thailand
Thomas and Uber
Badminton tournaments in Thailand
Thomas & Uber Cup
Thomas and Uber Cup